The 2023 S5000 Australian Drivers' Championship is the third season of the S5000 Australian Drivers' Championship. The championship is held under the new unified SpeedSeries banner, promoted and organized jointly by Motorsport Australia and the Australian Racing Group.

Drivers not only compete to win the Australian Drivers' Championship (the MA Gold Star), the last two rounds of the season will also double as the third edition of the S5000 Tasman Series.

Teams and drivers 
All teams compete with identical Rogers AF01/V8 single-seater racecars, Ligier/Onroak chassis powered by Ford Coyote V8 engines. For the 2023 season, a Pro-Am class will be introduced.

Race calendar 
The calendar for the third S5000 season was announced on 7 December 2022. After two years of holding the main S5000 season and the S5000 Tasman series as separate championships over five and two rounds respectively, this will change in 2023. All seven rounds now count towards the main S5000 Australian Drivers' Championship, with the last two rounds also counting towards the S5000 Tasman Series.

The category is scheduled to debut at Winton Raceway, while rounds at Albert Park and the Hidden Valley Raceway are not part of the provisional calendar. The second round was later confirmed to be held at Phillip Island Grand Prix Circuit, while further details on the sixth round are still to be finalized.

Race results

Championship standings

Scoring system 
At each meeting, a qualifying session and three races are held. Meeting points are awarded to the fastest ten qualifiers in qualifying, where the grid for Race 1 was set. For Race 2, the grid is set by the results of Race 1. The grid for the Main Event is defined by the points earned by the drivers across the weekend.

Drivers' standings

References

External links 

 
 2020 S5000 Australia Series Sporting and Technical Regulations, motorsport.org.au, as archived at web.archive.org on 6 June 2020

Australian Drivers' Championship
S5000 Australian
S5000 Australian
S5000 Australian